Adrian Raeside (born 1957 in Dunedin, New Zealand) is an author, comic strip creator and founder of an animation company.

Early years 
He began drawing cartoons on washroom walls as a kid.  After being expelled from his first (and last) art class at the age of 15, he moved with his parents to England, then to Canada. While there, he worked at various jobs, from loading grain ships in Thunder Bay, Ontario, to surveying on the West Coast. Illustrating his mother Joan Raeside's children's books got him his start in the art business. Raeside began drawing editorial cartoons for the Times Colonist in Victoria, British Columbia in 1979. He occupied the editorial cartoonist position until 2015, and after a break he returned to the newspaper in 2019. Raeside's editorial cartoons have been reprinted in hundreds of publications worldwide.

Career 
Raeside founded and operated an animation company in 1988 to animate editorial cartoons for CBC Television.  Over the next four years, he created, directed and produced dozens of animated shows for Turner Broadcasting and Children's Television Workshop, adapting two Jim Henson Muppet characters for animation.  Raeside adapted the book The Way Things Work as an animated series being broadcast on BBC. Raeside left animation production in 1992 but has since written dozens of scripts for animation, series that includes Atomic Betty, The Amazing Adrenalinis and Pirate Express.

In 1990 he created The Other Coast comic strip which features two dogs and looks at life from a dog's perspective. The Other Coast appears in hundreds of publications, worldwide.

Raeside is the author of sixteen books, including There Goes the Neighbourhood, an irreverent history of Canada; The Demented Decade; and 5 Twisted Years. Raeside also wrote and illustrated the popular Dennis the Dragon series of children's books. In 2009 he published Return to Antarctica, an account of his grandfather Sir Charles (Silas) Wrights' experience on Captain Robert Scott's 1910 British Antarctic Expedition to be first to reach the South Pole, which resulted in the death of Scott and four companions. Raeside researched the book by travelling to Cape Evans, in the Ross Sea, following in his grandfather's footsteps. Raeside is also related to two other members of the Scott Expedition: Sir Raymond Priestley and Griffith Taylor. Beside the book Return to Antarctica, Raeside produced a 1-hour documentary of the same name. 

In 2012 No Sailing Waits and Other Ferry Tales, a collection of A collection of BC ferry-related editorial cartoons was published by Harbour Publishing, followed by a collection of dog-related strips from The Other Coast strip called Tails don't Lie - a Decade of Dog Cartoons (70 in Dog Years) also published by Harbour publishing in 2013, remaining on the bestseller list for over 6 months. Raeside wrote and illustrated The Rainbow Bridge - A Visit to Pet Paradise (Harbour 2012) as a way to comfort those who have lost a pet. Raeside latest book:The Best of Adrian Raeside - A Treasury of BC Cartoons (Harbour 2014) is a collection of the best of his BC-related editorial cartoons.

Adrian Raeside lives in Whistler, British Columbia.

References

External links 
Records of Adrian Raeside are held by Simon Fraser University's Special Collections and Rare Books

Living people
New Zealand emigrants to Canada
1957 births